The Day Before may refer to:

 The Day Before (video game), an upcoming video game set to release in 2023.

The Day Before (EP), by Snob Scrilla
"The Day Before" (Jericho), an episode of the TV series